Permonautilus is an extinct genus of nautilids from the Upper Permian of Russia, named and described by Kruglov in 1933. Permonautilus is an involute, globular, spinose member of the Lirocertidae which are included in the Clydonautilaceae.  Whorl sections are broad, with a rounded venter.  The umbilicus in the middle of the shell is deep, from which spine-like processes extend laterally in the mature portion near the aperture. The siphuncle in Permonautilus is subcentral, the suture, slightly sinuous.

Externally, Permonautilus closely resembles the Pennsylvanian - Lower Permian Solenochilus and the Upper Mississippian Acanthonautilus, both which belong to the superfamily Aipocerataceae: Permonautilus differs from the latter two genera in the anatomy of the subcentral siphuncle.

See also

 Nautiloid
 List of nautiloids

References

 , B. 1964;Nautiloidea—Nautilida, in the Treatise on Invertebrate Paleontology, Part K Nautiliodea, Geological Society  of America and University of Kansas press. 
 Sepkoski, J.J. Jr. 2002. A compendium of fossil marine animal genera. D.J. Jablonski & M.L. Foote (eds.). Bulletins of American Paleontology 363: 1–560. Sepkoski's Online Genus Database (CEPHALOPODA)

Prehistoric nautiloid genera